Lord Grey may refer to:
 Thomas Grey, Lord Grey of Groby (ca. 1623–1657), MP for Leicester during the English Long Parliament, supported the Parliamentary cause in the Civil War and was a regicide
 Edward Grey, 1st Viscount Grey of Fallodon (1862–1933), British Foreign Secretary, 1905–1916
 Baron Grey (disambiguation), the title of several different lines of the British peerage
 Earl Grey, a title in the Peerage of the United Kingdom
 Charles Grey, 2nd Earl Grey (1764–1845), British prime minister, 1830–1834

See also 
 Lord Gray, a title in the Peerage of Scotland
 Lady Grey (disambiguation)